Peter Joseph Moor (born 2 February 1991) is a Zimbabwean cricketer, who now plays for Ireland. He plays as a wicket-keeper batsman and is a former vice-captain for the Zimbabwe cricket team. Moor holds an Irish passport, and since 2021, he played cricket in Ireland with an aim to qualify to play for the Ireland cricket team. In June 2022, Moor was selected in an Ireland Development XI to play a four-day game against Gloucestershire 2nd XI.

Domestic career
In December 2020, he was selected to play for the Tuskers in the 2020–21 Logan Cup. In April 2021, Cricket Ireland confirmed that Moor would be playing domestic cricket for Munster Reds during the summer of 2021.

In May 2022, in the third match of the 2022 Inter-Provincial Cup, Moor scored 152 runs against the Leinster Lightning, the highest individual score in the Inter-Provincial Cup.

International career
He made his One Day International (ODI) debut for Zimbabwe against Bangladesh on 26 November 2014. He made his Twenty20 International debut for Zimbabwe against Afghanistan on 8 January 2016.

In July 2016 he was named in Zimbabwe's Test squad for their series against New Zealand. He made his Test debut in the second Test on 6 August 2016.

In June 2018, he was named in a Board XI team for warm-up fixtures ahead of the 2018 Zimbabwe Tri-Nation Series. In February 2019, Zimbabwe Cricket confirmed that Moor would be the vice-captain of the national side across all three formats for the 2019–20 season.

Captaincy
In April 2019, he was named captain of Zimbabwe's ODI team for their series against the United Arab Emirates, after their regular captain, Hamilton Masakadza, was ruled out of the tour due to injury.

Ireland career
He qualified for Ireland in October 2022, and was named in the Irish test squad to face Bangladesh and Sri Lanka in February 2023.

References

External links
 

1991 births
Living people
Zimbabwean cricketers
Zimbabwe One Day International cricketers
Zimbabwe Twenty20 International cricketers
Zimbabwe Test cricketers
Zimbabwean ODI captains
Cricketers from Harare
Northerns (Zimbabwe) cricketers
Mashonaland Eagles cricketers
Mid West Rhinos cricketers
Zimbabwe Select XI cricketers
White Zimbabwean sportspeople
Munster Reds cricketers
Wicket-keepers